The Stadio Olimpico del Nuoto (Olympic Swimming Stadium) is an aquatics centre at the Foro Italico in Rome, Italy. Inaugurated in 1959, it was designed by the architects Enrico Del Debbio and Aniballe Vitellozzi to host the swimming, diving, water polo, and swimming portion of the modern pentathlon events for the 1960 Summer Olympics.

The venue was refurbished to host the 1983 European Aquatics Championships, and reconfigured and expanded for the 1994 World Aquatics Championships. The stadium was the main venue of the World Championships again in 2009, and will host the European Aquatics Championships in 2022.

References
1960 Summer Olympics official report. Volume 1. pp. 62–4.
1960 Summer Olympics official report. Volume 2. Part 2. p. 661.

Sports venues in Rome
Venues of the 1960 Summer Olympics
Olympic diving venues
Olympic modern pentathlon venues
Olympic swimming venues
Olympic water polo venues
Sports venues completed in 1959
Rome Q. XV Della Vittoria